Mount Pleasant High School may refer to one of the following secondary schools:

Mount Pleasant High School (Arkansas) — Mount Pleasant, Arkansas
Mt. Pleasant High School (San Jose, California) — San Jose, California
Mount Pleasant High School (Delaware) — Wilmington, Delaware
Mount Pleasant High School (Iowa) — Mount Pleasant, Iowa
Mount Pleasant High School (Michigan) — Mount Pleasant, Michigan
Mount Pleasant High School (North Carolina) — Mount Pleasant, North Carolina
Mount Pleasant High School (North Dakota) — Rolla, North Dakota
Mount Pleasant High School (Pennsylvania) — Mount Pleasant, Pennsylvania
Mount Pleasant High School (Rhode Island) — Providence, Rhode Island
Mount Pleasant High School (South Carolina) — Mount Pleasant, South Carolina
Mount Pleasant High School (Tennessee) — Mount Pleasant, Tennessee
Mount Pleasant High School (Texas) — Mount Pleasant, Texas
Mount Pleasant High School (Harare, Zimbabwe) — Harare, Zimbabwe

See also
 Mount Pleasant School (disambiguation)